The European Journal of Epidemiology is a monthly peer-reviewed medical journal covering the epidemiology of communicable and non-communicable diseases and their control. It is published by Springer Science+Business Media and the editor-in-chief is Albert Hofman (Harvard T.H. Chan School of Public Health). The journal was established in 1985 with Antiono Sanna as founding editor.

Editors-in-chief
Sanna served as editor for 6 years, until 1992. He was succeeded by Carlo Chezzi (1992–1994), after which Claude Hannoun took over (1994–2002). Hannoun changed the direction of the journal, expanding the scope to include population health and non-communicable diseases. Finally, Albert Hofman became editor in 2002.

Abstracting and indexing
The journal is abstracted and indexed in:

According to the Journal Citation Reports, the journal has a 2018 impact factor of 6.529.

References

External links

Epidemiology journals
Publications established in 1985
Monthly journals
English-language journals
Springer Science+Business Media academic journals